Andrew Swallow (11 August 1904 – 15 June 1969) was a Scottish footballer who played as a centre half or left half.

A member of North Lanarkshire's Lithuanian immigrant community and registered at birth with the surname Kregždė (anglicised to Kregsdis, this translates to swallow which was subsequently adopted by the family)  he began his senior career with St Johnstone, newly promoted to Scottish Division One in November 1924. From then he was a regular presence in the Saints defence alongside the likes of Hugh Lafferty and Willie Imrie, making nearly 200 appearances in the league and Scottish Cup as the Perth club maintained their top-level status until the end of the 1929–30 season when they were relegated, at which point Swallow departed, moving on to English football with Millwall. He played less regularly for the Lions than he had in Scotland, making 40 appearances across five years (four in the Football League Second Division and the last in the Third Division South). In 1935 he returned north of the border and spent one season with Morton. He spent his later life working as a bookmaker's clerk in Perth, his wife's hometown.

Swallow was a member of a Scottish Football Association party which toured North America in 1927, but never received a full cap for Scotland.

References

1904 births
1969 deaths
Footballers from Bellshill
Association football central defenders
Association football wing halves
Scottish footballers
Scottish people of Lithuanian descent
St Johnstone F.C. players
Millwall F.C. players
Greenock Morton F.C. players
Glasgow United F.C. players
Scottish Junior Football Association players
Scottish Football League players
English Football League players